Jim Allin (born March 14, 1986) is a former Canadian football defensive back and kick returner. He went undrafted in the 2009 CFL Draft. He played CIS football for the Queen's Golden Gaels.

In the 2008 CIS football season, Allin was named to CIS All-Canadian first team as a kick returner and to both the Ontario University Athletics first and second all-star teams; the first as a returner and the second as a cornerback. He performed the best among defensive backs in three of the athletic tests at the 2009 CFL Evaluation Camp including setting a record for the 20-yard shuttle test with a time of 3.97 seconds.

In August 2016, in ceremonies in Canada and Australia, Jim married the love of his life, Tegan Hamilton.

References

External links
Queen's Golden Gaels bio

1986 births
Living people
Canadian football defensive backs
Canadian football return specialists
Queen's Golden Gaels football players
Sportspeople from Belleville, Ontario
Players of Canadian football from Ontario